Paphiopedilum wardii is a species of orchid found from southwestern Yunnan to Myanmar.

wardii